Samuel Holland may refer to: 
 Samuel H. Holland, state senator in Arkansas
 Samuel Holland (politician) (1803–1892), Welsh Liberal party politician
 Samuel Holland (surveyor) (1728–1801), Dutch-born Surveyor General of British North America
 Samuel Holland (baseball) (born 1994), Australian baseball player

See also 
 Holland (surname)